James Kenyon (1846 – 25 February 1924) was an English woollen manufacturer and Conservative Party politician from Bury in Lancashire, 1895–1902.

Early life 
Kenyon was the second son of James Kenyon and his first wife Margaret (née Whittaker) of Crimble, near Heywood in Lancashire. He was educated at Bury Grammar School and at Liverpool Collegiate Institution.

He was a prosperous woollen manufacturer with a large factory in Bury. He became a Justice of the Peace (J.P.) for Lancashire, a Fellow of the Royal Colonial Institute, and was chairman of the Liverpool Storage Company. His residence was listed in 1901 as Walshaw Hall, Bury, which later became a residential care home.

In 1875, he had married a German born Elise Genth, a classically trained musician from Burnage. They had four sons who assisted in running the business: James died from illness as a result of service in World War I, Charles became a successful actor/manager in London and Myles played cricket for Lancashire.

Political career 

He was elected at the 1895 general election as the Member of Parliament (MP) for borough of Bury, having stood unsuccessfully in nearby Heywood at the 1885 election.

He was re-elected in Bury in 1900, but resigned his seat in the House of Commons two years later, by the procedural device of becoming Steward of the Manor of Northstead on 29 April 1902.

References

External links 

1846 births
1924 deaths
Conservative Party (UK) MPs for English constituencies
UK MPs 1895–1900
UK MPs 1900–1906
Politics of the Metropolitan Borough of Bury
People educated at Bury Grammar School